Giribawa Divisional Secretariat is a  Divisional Secretariat  of Kurunegala District, of North Western Province, Sri Lanka. The population was 31,412 at the 2012 Sri Lankan census.

References

 Divisional Secretariats Portal

Divisional Secretariats of Kurunegala District